Samantha Davies (born 20 September 1979) is a British sprinter. She competed in the women's 200 metres at the 2000 Summer Olympics.

Davies met baseball player Royce Clayton in 2000. They married the next year. Clayton credited Davies with teaching him to keep his legs in condition with the longevity of his baseball career; he ran  sprints during the offseason to maintain his speed. They have two daughters and two sons, including triplets.

Davies is a sprinting coach at Pepperdine University.

International competitions

References

External links
 

1979 births
Living people
Athletes (track and field) at the 2000 Summer Olympics
British female sprinters
Olympic athletes of Great Britain
Place of birth missing (living people)
Olympic female sprinters